Frost is a city in Faribault County, Minnesota, United States. The population was 198 at the 2010 census.

History
A post office called Frost has been in operation since 1899. The city was named for architect Charles Sumner Frost.

Geography

Demographics

2010 census
As of the census of 2010, there were 198 people, 95 households, and 59 families living in the city. The racial makeup of the city was 97.0% White, 0.5% African American, 0.5% Native American, and 2.0% from two or more races. Hispanic or Latino of any race were 1.0% of the population.

There were 95 households, of which 22.1% had children under the age of 18 living with them, 51.6% were married couples living together, 7.4% had a female householder with no husband present, 3.2% had a male householder with no wife present, and 37.9% were non-families. 31.6% of all households were made up of individuals, and 11.6% had someone living alone who was 65 years of age or older. The average household size was 2.08 and the average family size was 2.59.

The median age in the city was 47.8 years. 18.7% of residents were under the age of 18; 6% were between the ages of 18 and 24; 21.2% were from 25 to 44; 34.4% were from 45 to 64; and 19.7% were 65 years of age or older. The gender makeup of the city was 49.0% male and 51.0% female.

2000 census
As of the census of 2000, there were 251 people, 115 households, and 66 families living in the city. The racial makeup of the city was 96.81% White, 0.40% Asian, 2.79% from other races. Hispanic or Latino of any race were 2.79% of the population.

There were 115 households, out of which 32.2% had children under the age of 18 living with them, 43.5% were married couples living together, 9.6% had a female householder with no husband present, and 42.6% were non-families. 40.0% of all households were made up of individuals, and 25.2% had someone living alone who was 65 years of age or older.  The average household size was 2.18 and the average family size was 2.94.

In the city, the population was spread out, with 27.9% under the age of 18, 9.6% from 18 to 24, 27.5% from 25 to 44, 14.7% from 45 to 64, and 20.3% who were 65 years of age or older.  The median age was 38 years. For every 100 females, there were 87.3 males.  For every 100 females age 18 and over, there were 81.0 males.

The median income for a household in the city was $26,389, and the median income for a family was $34,792. Males had a median income of $27,708 versus $23,750 for females. The per capita income for the city was $14,756.  About 8.8% of families and 12.8% of the population were below the poverty line, including 16.7% of those under the age of eighteen and 18.2% of those 65 or over.

Notable people
 Ernest Anderson (1902-1992), Farmer and Minnesota state legislator, was born in Frost.
 Lon Clark, actor
 Dale Erdahl (1931-2005), Businessman and Minnesota state legislator, was born in Frost.
 Ludwig B. Erdahl (1889-1969), Farmer and Minnesota state legislator, was born in Frost.

Media

Television

References

Cities in Minnesota
Cities in Faribault County, Minnesota